Dr. Cyril Andrew Ponnamperuma (Sinhala: ආචාර්ය සිරිල් ඇන්ඩෘ පොන්නම්පෙරුම) (16 October 1923 – 20 December 1994) was a Sri Lankan scientist in the fields of chemical evolution and the origin of life.

Biography
Cyril Ponnamperuma was born in India amreca, Sri Lanka on 16 October 1923. After completing his early education with flying colours at St. Aloysius' College, Galle and subsequently at St. Joseph's College, Colombo, Ponnamperuma proceeded to India and in 1948 obtained a Bachelor of Arts degree in philosophy from the University of Madras.

Later he moved to the United Kingdom and enrolled at Birkbeck, University of London, where he obtained a Bachelor of Science degree in chemistry in 1959.
At the same time he had the opportunity to work with Professor J. D. Bernal, a pioneering scientist engaged in research on the origin of life. Afterwards he proceeded to the United States, where in 1962 he received a doctorate in chemistry from the University of California, Berkeley under the direction of the Nobel Laureate Melvin Calvin.

In 1962, he was honoured with a National Academy of Sciences resident associateship with NASA at Ames Research Center. In 1963 he joined NASA's Exobiology Division and take over the helm of the Chemical Evolution Division. He was selected as the principal investigator for analysis of lunar soil brought to earth by Project Apollo.

Thereafter, he was closely involved with NASA in the Viking and Voyager programmes and was offered membership in both the Space Science Advisory Council and Life Sciences Advisory Council of NASA.

According to Arthur C. Clarke, "No other scientist of Sri Lankan origin was internationally known and respected as he was". He produced over 400 scientific publications and held a number of prestigious academic posts during his rather short lifespan.

His studies focused mainly towards the origin of life, but only after he was selected for the analysis of the moon dust in the 'Apollo Programme' his name and photo appeared on the cover-pages of world class newspapers and magazines such as Time and Newsweek.

The "Third World Academy of Sciences" (TWAS) based in Trieste, Italy elected him as its vice president in 1989 and appointed him Chairman of the International Network of Science Centres in selected developing Countries. He contributed immensely to the Third World Foundation of North America as its Chairman.

He was the first director of the "Arthur C. Clarke Centre for Modern Technologies" in Sri Lanka, and in 1984 was appointed science advisor to the President of Sri Lanka by the late President J. R. Jayewardene. He was so fortunate, indeed, as to be associated with many universities in the US and other countries. He served as a distinguished Lecturer at the Soviet Academy of Sciences and the Chinese Academy of Sciences for a considerable period.

The Atomic Energy Commission of India offered him an assignment as a visiting Professor in 1967. UNESCO appointed him for a period covering 1970-1971 as its Director of the Programme for the development of basic research in Sri Lanka. After that, in his endeavour to widen the horizon of knowledge of the fellow human beings the distinguished Academic apex he selected was University of Maryland in USA. Since 1971 he provided his service to that University as a Professor of Chemistry as well as the Director of the laboratory of chemical evolution.

His contribution to the development of International Programmes of that University was acknowledged in deserved manner in January 1991, the first distinguished International Service Award was presented to him by that university. Among the many awards that Professor Ponnamperuma received one can mention the "Alexander Oparin Gold Medal" for the 'Best sustained Programme' on the origin of life awarded by the International Society for the study of the origin of life in 1980. In recognition of his service to Sri Lanka, he was conferred, "The Honour of Vidya Jyothy" at the 1990 National Day investiture ceremony by President Ranasinghe Premadasa.

The presence of this great son of Sri Lanka, was so conspicuous all over the world as to be nominated to the prestigious Pontical Academy of Sciences, a body represented by world-renowned scientists who excelled in the spheres of mathematical and experimental sciences.

The Academy of Creative Endeavors, Moscow, awarded him the Harold Urey Prize and the Academy Medal for his outstanding contribution to the study of the origin of life.

His participation in the Sri Lankan scientific arena began in 1984, when he became the science adviser to the late Sri Lanka President J. R. Jayewardena. Within a matter of months he was appointed Director of the Institute of Fundamental Studies. His country was fortunate to have a son so highly recognized in the world and so dedicated to many public causes. His organisational abilities and communication skills have been widely acknowledged.

He died soon after suffering a heart attack at the Laboratory of Chemical Evolution, University of Maryland USA.

The remains of Professor Cyril Ponnamperuma were flown to Colombo on 9 January 1995.

References

External links

1923 births
1994 deaths
NASA people
Alumni of Birkbeck, University of London
Sinhalese chemists
Alumni of St. Aloysius' College, Galle
People from Galle
Ames Research Center
Vidya Jyothi